Emden  may refer to one of the following German naval ships that were named after the town of Emden on the Ems River:

 , a  light cruiser of the Kaiserliche Marine commissioned in 1909. She sank two Allied warships and sank or captured nearly thirty Allied merchant vessels during World War I, and was run aground after the Battle of Cocos in 1914.
 , a unique light cruiser of the Reichsmarine (later Kriegsmarine) commissioned in 1925 and scrapped in 1949.

German Navy ship names